= Stella's Fish Café =

Restaurant information
- Established: 2005
- Closed: November 19, 2022
- Food type: Seafood
- Location: 1400 W Lake Street, Minneapolis, Hennepin, Minnesota, 55408, United States
- Website: stellasfishcafe.com

Stella's Fish Café & Prestige Oyster Bar was a rooftop seafood restaurant and oyster bar by day and a dance club by night on west Lake Street in Minneapolis, Minnesota. On November 19, 2022 the restaurant announced that it would close its doors on November 26 after 17 years in service.

== History ==
Stella's Fish Café opened for business in 2005. In September 2022 a video of a rat crawling across a bin of rice at the restaurant went viral, causing the café to shut down temporarily.
